Porto Ercole is an Italian town located in the municipality of Monte Argentario, in the Province of Grosseto, Tuscany. It is one of the two major towns that form the township, along with Porto Santo Stefano. Its name means "Port Hercules".

Geography 
To the north of Porto Ercole are located the Laguna di Orbetello and the Tombolo della Feniglia.

History 
Porto Ercole was first mentioned in 1296, when Margherita Aldobrandeschi, countess of Sovana, ordered the construction of a tower named Torre di Terra, the oldest core of the town.

In 1610, the Italian Baroque painter Caravaggio, exiled by the Pope, died in Porto Ercole on his way back to Rome and was buried in a local church. The Dutch Royal Family maintained a summer residence here in the latter half of the twentieth century.

Transportation 
Porto Ercole was once connected by rail to Orbetello via a small rail line to Porto Santo Stefano, closed in 1944. The former station, named Porto Ercole-Terrarossa, was located 4 km from the town, in the hamlet of Terrarossa.

It counts two harbours: Porto Vecchio, the old town's port, and Cala Galera, located in a northern bay.

Twin towns 
  Caravaggio, Italy; since 1973

Photogallery

See also 
Porto Santo Stefano
Battle of Orbetello
Yacht Club Santo Stefano
 Forte La Rocca Lighthouse

References

External links 

 Porto Ercole official website
 Monte Argentario official website

Coastal towns in Tuscany
Frazioni of Monte Argentario
Mediterranean port cities and towns in Italy